CFIT most commonly refers to controlled flight into terrain. It may also refer to:

 The Cattell Culture Fair III IQ test
 CFIT-FM, a Canadian radio station